Cylindriscala is a genus of predatory sea snails, marine prosobranch gastropod mollusks in the family Epitoniidae, commonly known as wentletraps.

Species
According to the World Register of Marine Species, the following species with valid names are included within the genus Cylindriscala :
 Cylindriscala acus (R. B. Watson, 1883)
 Cylindriscala aequatorialis (Thiele, 1925)
 Cylindriscala andrewsii (A. E. Verrill, 1882)
 Cylindriscala aurantia Bouchet & Warén, 1986
 Cylindriscala distincta (E. A. Smith, 1891)
 Cylindriscala elata (Suter, 1917) †
 Cylindriscala enamelis (Nakayama, 1995)
 Cylindriscala guernei (Dautzenberg & de Boury, 1897)
 Cylindriscala humerosa (Schepman, 1909)
 Cylindriscala jeffreysi (Tryon, 1887)
 Cylindriscala kaiparaensis (Laws, 1944) †
 Cylindriscala lawsi P. A. Maxwell, 1992 †
 Cylindriscala lirulata (Thiele, 1925)
 Cylindriscala mirifica (P. Fischer in Filhol, 1886)
 Cylindriscala nitida (Kuroda & Ito, 1961)
 Cylindriscala orientalis (Thiele, 1925)
 Cylindriscala paradoxa Garcia, 2003
 Cylindriscala rosenbergi Garcia, 2005
 Cylindriscala sibogae (Schepman, 1909)
 Cylindriscala solar (Nakayama, 1995)
 Cylindriscala suteri P. A. Maxwell, 1992 †
 Cylindriscala thalassae Bouchet & Warén, 1986
 Cylindriscala tortilis (R. B. Watson, 1883)
 Cylindriscala turrita (Nakayama, 1995)
 Cylindriscala vicina (Dautzenberg & de Boury, 1897)
Species brought into synonymy
 Cylindriscala fulgens (de Boury, 1909) : synonym of Cylindriscala acus (R. B. Watson, 1883)
 Cylindriscala funiculata (R. B. Watson, 1883) : synonym of Punctiscala watsoni (de Boury, 1911)
 Cylindriscala grimaldii (Dautzenberg & de Boury, 1897) : synonym of Cylindriscala jeffreysi (Tryon, 1887)
 Cylindriscala solidula (Monterosato, 1875) : synonym of Cylindriscala acus (R. B. Watson, 1883)
 Cylindriscala watsoni (de Boury, 1911) : synonym of Punctiscala watsoni (de Boury, 1911)

References

 Kuroda, T. & Itô, K. (1961) Molluscan shells from southern Kii. Venus, 21, 243–267, 2 pls.
 Gofas, S.; Le Renard, J.; Bouchet, P. (2001). Mollusca. in: Costello, M.J. et al. (eds), European Register of Marine Species: a check-list of the marine species in Europe and a bibliography of guides to their identification. Patrimoines Naturels. 50: 180–213.
 Spencer, H.G., Marshall, B.A. & Willan, R.C. (2009). Checklist of New Zealand living Mollusca. pp 196–219. in: Gordon, D.P. (ed.) New Zealand inventory of biodiversity. Volume one. Kingdom Animalia: Radiata, Lophotrochozoa, Deuterostomia. Canterbury University Press, Christchurch

External links
 Boury E. (de) (1909). Catalogue des sous-genres de Scalidae. Journal de Conchyliologie, 57: 255-258
 Cossmann, M. (1912). Essais de paléoconchologie comparée. Neuvième livraison. Paris, The author and J. Lamarre & Cie. 215 pp., 10 pls
 Lima, S.F.B. & Christoffersen M.T. (2012) Checklist of Recent Cylindriscala (Caenogastropoda: Epitoniidae) of the world. Check List 8(4): 740–743
 Brown L.G. & Neville B.D. (2015). Catalog of the recent taxa of the families Epitoniidae and Nystiellidae (Mollusca: Gastropoda) with a bibliography of the descriptive and systematic literature. Zootaxa. 3907(1): 1-188
  Serge GOFAS, Ángel A. LUQUE, Joan Daniel OLIVER,José TEMPLADO & Alberto SERRA (2021) - The Mollusca of Galicia Bank (NE Atlantic Ocean); European Journal of Taxonomy 785: 1–114

Epitoniidae